Silvan Hefti (born 25 October 1997) is a Swiss footballer who plays as a defender for  club Genoa. He has also made appearances for the Switzerland U21 national team.

Club career
On 3 January 2022, Hefti joined Serie A side Genoa on a permanent deal.

Personal life
Hefti is the older brother of the footballer Nias Hefti.

Career statistics

Club

References

External links

Living people
1997 births
People from Rorschach, Switzerland
Association football defenders
Swiss men's footballers
Switzerland under-21 international footballers
Switzerland youth international footballers
Swiss Super League players
Serie A players
Serie B players
FC St. Gallen players
BSC Young Boys players
Genoa C.F.C. players
Swiss expatriate footballers
Expatriate footballers in Italy
Swiss expatriate sportspeople in Italy
Sportspeople from the canton of St. Gallen